The men's football tournament at the 1989 South Asian Games was held from 20 to 26 October in Pakistan.

Fixtures and results

Group A

Group B

Medal Matches

medal match

medal match

Winner

References

External links
 RSSSF - 6th South Asian Federation Games 1989 (Islamabad, Pakistan)

1989 South Asian Games
1989 South Asian Games